Kaifeng is a prefecture-level city in east-central Henan province, China. It is one of the Eight Ancient Capitals of China, having been the capital eight times in history, and is best known for having been the Chinese capital during the Northern Song dynasty.

As of 31 December 2018, around 4,465,000 people lived in Kaifeng's Prefecture, of whom 1,652,000 lived in the built-up (or metro) area made of Xiangfu, Longting, Shunhe Hui, Gulou and Yuwantai Districts. Located along the Yellow River's southern bank, it borders the provincial capital of Zhengzhou to the west, Xinxiang to the northwest, Shangqiu to the east, Zhoukou to the southeast, Xuchang to the southwest, and Heze of Shandong to the northeast.

Kaifeng is also a major city in the world by scientific research outputs as tracked by the Nature Index. The city is home to a campus of Henan University, one of the national key universities in the Double First Class University Plan.

Names
The postal romanization for the city is "Kaifeng". Historically it has also been known as:
Dàliáng
Biànliáng
Biànzhōu
Nánjīng, from its status as the Jurchen Jin's southern capital and not to be confused with modern-day Nanjing
Dōngjīng
Biànjīng

The area was named "Kaifeng" after the Qin's conquest of China in the second century BC. The name literally means "opening the border" and figuratively "hidden" and "vengeance". Its name was originally Qifeng, but the syllable qi (Baxter-Sagart: /*kʰˤijʔ/) was changed to the essentially synonymous kai (/*Nə-[k]ʰˤəj/, /*[k]ʰˤəj/) to avoid the naming taboo of Liu Qi (Emperor Jing of Han).

Administration
The prefecture-level city of Kaifeng administers five districts and four counties:
Gulou District
Longting District
Yuwangtai District
Xiangfu District
Shunhe Hui District
Weishi County
Qi County
Tongxu County
Lankao County

History

Kaifeng is one of the Eight Ancient Capitals of China. As with Beijing, there have been many reconstructions during its history.

In 364 BC during the Warring States period, the State of Wei founded a city called Daliang as its capital in this area. During this period, the first of many canals in the area was constructed linking a local river to the Yellow River. When the State of Qin conquered the State of Wei, Kaifeng was destroyed and abandoned except for a mid-sized market town, which remained in place.

During the Han Dynasty, the city underwent some reconstruction. Kaifeng became the capital of Liu Wu (son of Han emperor Wen) when he was enfeoffed as Prince of Liang. Liu Wu restored and constructed many buildings and old city walls. Kaifeng became a center of music, art, a refuge for artists, and of splendid gardens despite the trivial political importance of the city at this period.

Early in the 7th century, Kaifeng was transformed into a major commercial hub when it was connected to the Grand Canal as well as through the construction of a canal running to western Shandong.

In 781 during the Tang dynasty, a new city was reconstructed and named Bian. Bian was the capital of the Later Jin (936–946), Later Han (947–950), and Later Zhou (951–960) of the Five Dynasties and Ten Kingdoms period. The Song dynasty made Bian its capital when it overthrew the Later Zhou in 960. Shortly afterwards, the city underwent further expansion.

During the Song, when it was known as Dongjing or Bianjing, Kaifeng, then the largest and most prosperous city in China, was the capital, with a population of over 400,000 living both inside and outside the city wall. Typhus was an acute problem in the city. The historian Jacques Gernet provides a lively picture of life in this period in his Daily Life in China on the Eve of the Mongol Invasion, 1250-1276, which often draws on Dongjing Meng Hua Lu, a nostalgic memoir of the city of Kaifeng.

It has survived the vicissitudes of war and floods to become the oldest landmark in this ancient city. Another Song-dynasty pagoda, dating from 974, has been partially destroyed.

Another well-known sight was the astronomical clock tower of the engineer, scientist, and statesman Su Song (1020–1101 AD). It was crowned with a rotating armillary sphere that was hydraulically-powered (i.e. by water wheel and a water clock), yet it incorporated an escapement mechanism two hundred years before they were found in the clockworks of Europe and featured the first known endless power-transmitting chain drive.

Kaifeng reached its peak importance in the 11th century as a commercial and industrial center at the intersection of four major canals. During this time, the city was surrounded by three rings of city walls and probably had a population of between 600,000 and 700,000. It is believed that Kaifeng was the largest city in the world from 1013 to 1127.

This period ended in 1127 when the city fell to Jurchen invaders during the Jingkang Incident. It subsequently came under the rule of the Jurchen Jin dynasty, which had conquered most of North China during the Jin–Song Wars. While it remained an important administrative center, only the area inside the inner city wall of the early Song remained settled and the two outer rings were abandoned.

As the imperial capital of the Song, Kaifeng was conveniently situated along the Grand Canal for logistics supply but militarily vulnerable due to its position on the floodplains of the Yellow River.

Kaifeng served as the Jurchen "southern capital" from 1157 (other sources say 1161) and was reconstructed during this time. The Jurchen kept their main capital further north until 1214 when they were forced to move the imperial court southwards to Kaifeng in order to flee from the onslaught of the Mongols. In 1232 they succumbed to the combined Mongol and Song forces in the Mongol siege of Kaifeng. The Mongols captured the city and in 1279 conquered all of China. During the Yuan dynasty Bianliang became the capital of Henan Jiangbei Province, which was established in 1277.

In the Mongol siege of Kaifeng, the Mongols and Han Chinese (who defected to the Mongols) slaughtered the male members of the Jin Jurchen Wanyan Imperial family and took the royal women including the Jin concubines and princesses to Mongolia as war booty. Mongols looted the city when it fell, but atypical to most sieges in the time period, they permitted trade. The richest residents of the city sold their luxury belongings to Mongol soldiers for critically needed food supplies. Male members of the Jurchen Jin Wanyan royal family residing in the city were captured and executed. All Jin imperial concubines, including the empress dowager, were captured and taken north.

In 1260, Marco Polo arrived at Kaifeng, and wrote about it in his diaries.

The city was briefly captured around the mid-14th century by the Red Turban rebels who made it their capital for ten years. They were crushed by the newly established Ming forces. At the beginning of the Ming dynasty in 1368, Kaifeng was made the capital of Henan province.

In 1642, Kaifeng was flooded by the Ming army with water from the Yellow River to prevent the peasant rebel Li Zicheng from taking over. After this disaster, the city was abandoned again.
(262nd most destructive act of warfare in Chinese history)

In 1662, during the reign of the Kangxi Emperor in the Qing dynasty, Kaifeng was rebuilt. Another reconstruction in 1843 followed flooding in 1841, shaping Kaifeng as it stands today.

From the 8th to 9th century and up to the 19th century, Kaifeng is known for having the oldest extant Jewish community in China, the Kaifeng Jews. As of 2016, there are 20 Jews still left in the city.

On 6 June 1938, the city was occupied by the invading Japanese Imperial Army. Kaifeng remained the capital of Henan province until 1954, when it was moved to Zhengzhou. In 1969, the former President of the People's Republic of China, Liu Shaoqi, died from medical neglect while under house arrest in Kaifeng.

Climate
Kaifeng has a monsoon-influenced humid subtropical climate (Köppen Cwa) that borders on a humid continental climate, with four distinct seasons. Winters are cool and mostly dry while summers are hot and humid; spring is warm and sees some, but not much rainfall, while autumn weather is crisp and drier. Precipitation mainly occurs from June to September.

Transportation

Air

With the completion of Zhengzhou–Kaifeng intercity railway and Zhengzhou–Xinzheng Airport intercity railway, fast train connections to Zhengzhou Xinzheng International Airport from Kaifeng became available. As of August 2018, there are 12 pairs of intercity trains running between Xinzheng Airport and Songchenglu every day, with a travel time of 53 min.

Rail

Kaifeng railway station is on the east–west Longhai Railway mainline and provides convenient access to many cities around China, including Beijing West, Shanghai, Shanghai Hongqiao, Tianjin, Xi'an, Jinan, Hangzhou. Services to Zhengzhou, Luoyang and Qingdao are also frequent and convenient. Direct long-distance services to Shenzhen, Guangzhou, Chengdu, Chongqing North, Harbin, Ürümqi, Fuzhou, Dalian and Wuhan are also available.

The Zhengzhou–Kaifeng intercity railway started operation on 28 December 2014, connecting the provincial capital Zhengzhou and Kaifeng. The railway currently terminates at Songchenglu, and is planned to be extended to Kaifeng railway station.

Kaifeng North railway station of the Xuzhou–Lanzhou high-speed railway is the main high-speed railway station of the city. It started operation on 10 September 2016.

Coach

There are 4 main coach stations in Kaifeng:
Kaifeng West Coach Station
Kaifeng Long-Distance Coach Station
Kaifeng Jinming Coach Station
Kaifeng Xiangguosi Coach Station

There are frequent services to many neighboring counties, other provincial cities and long-distance services to other provinces.

Road transport
 G30 Lianyungang–Khorgas Expressway
 G45 Daqing–Guangzhou Expressway
 S82 Zhengzhou–Minquan Expressway
 S83 Lankao–Nanyang Expressway
 China National Highway 106
 China National Highway 220
 China National Highway 310

Culture

Religion

Kaifeng is known for having the oldest extant Jewish community in China, the Kaifeng Jews.

It also has a significant Muslim enclave and is notable for its many women's mosques (nǚsì), including the oldest nǚsì in China: Wangjia Hutong Women's Mosque, which dates to 1820.

There are also some active Christian churches, like Sacred-Heart of Kaifeng cathedral.

Cuisine

Kaifeng cuisine plays a dominant part in forming Henan cuisine.

Kaifeng offers a wide range of food specialties such as steamed pie and dumplings. Particularly famous is Kaifeng's five-spice bread (wǔxiāng shāobǐng), which, like pita, can be opened and filled. In the evening, Kaifeng's streets turn into restaurants while hundreds open their stands and begin selling their food in the famous night market. People from nearby Zhengzhou often come to Kaifeng to visit family members and to enjoy the atmosphere.

The Ma Yu Ching's Bucket Chicken House, located in Kaifeng, is by some accounts the world's oldest restaurant.

Chrysanthemums

The chrysanthemum is the city flower of Kaifeng. The tradition of cultivating varieties of chrysanthemums extends back 1600 years, and the scale of cultivation reached its height during the Song dynasty until its loss to the Jürchens in 1126.

The city has held the Kaifeng Chrysanthemum Cultural Festival since 1983 (renamed China Kaifeng Chrysanthemum Cultural Festival in 1994). The festival has since taken place between 18 October and 18 November of every year.

The festival reached another milestone on 18 October 2012, when it celebrated its 30th birthday. The opening ceremony was broadcast live during the evening prime slot on Henan Television (HNTV), which broadcasts to all Chinese cities at or above the prefecture level.

During the festival, hundreds of chrysanthemums breeds are on show at festival venues, and the flower becomes a common features around the city. Kaifeng has been dubbed the "city of chrysanthemums".

Sporting events

Zheng-Kai International Marathon

The  (Zheng-Kai stands for "Zhengzhou-Kaifeng", also abbreviated "ZK") is a sporting event hosted jointly by the Chinese Athletic Association, the general sport administration of Henan province, Zhengzhou municipal government, and the Kaifeng municipal government. It is the premier international sports competition in Henan province and one of the biggest sports competitions in the Central-West of China. ZK International Marathon is held at the end of March or beginning of April each year. The main part of the event occurs along the famous Zhengkai Express Way. At its launch in 2007, 5600 athletes competed. By 2012, almost 25000 athletes from 28 countries and regions have participated in the ZK International Marathon.

Military
Kaifeng is the headquarters of the 20th Group Army of the People's Liberation Army, one of three group armies that comprise the Jinan Military Region responsible for the defense of the Yellow River Plain.

Kaifeng Air Base is a military airfield in the southern suburb of Kaifeng City. It does not provide civilian aviation service.

Gallery

Twin towns – sister cities

Kaifeng is twinned with:

 Kiryat Motzkin, Israel
 Omsk, Russia
 Toda, Japan
 Wichita, United States
 Wingecarribee, Australia
 Yeongcheon, South Korea

Colleges and universities

Public
Henan University (founded 1912)
Kaifeng University (founded 1980)
Kaifeng Institute of Education
Yellow River Conservancy Technical Institute (founded 1929)

See also
Historical capitals of China
1642 Yellow River flood

References

Further reading

The Origin of the Kaifeng Jews, in S. Shaked, ed., Irano-Judaica, Jerusalem, 1982, pp. 101–11

External links

Government website of Kaifeng (in Simplified Chinese)
Kaifeng City Portal (in Simplified Chinese)
Notes on the Jewish colony at Kaifeng from the Papers of Charles Daniel Tenney

 
360s BC establishments
364 BC
Historic Jewish communities
Populated places established in the 4th century BC
History of the Jews in Asia
Chinese Jews
Prefecture-level divisions of Henan